Barwar is a town and a nagar panchayat in Lakhimpur Kheri district in the state of Uttar Pradesh, India. It is a crowded town situated near the shahjahanpur. The Gomti river flows through the town. The town is divided into 11 wards.

Demographics
 India census,

References

Cities and towns in Lakhimpur Kheri district